Carole Caldwell Graebner and Nancy Richey were the defending champions but only Nancy Richey did compete this year.

Seeds 
Champion seeds are indicated in bold text while text in italics indicates the round in which those seeds were eliminated. The joint top and one team of joint fifth seeded teams received byes into the second round.

Draw

Final

Top half

Bottom half

External links 
 1967 Australian Championships Women's Doubles Draw

1967 in Australian tennis
Women's Doubles